The siege of Smolensk was one of the first great events of the Russo-Polish War (1654–67). Smolensk, which had been under the rule of the Polish–Lithuanian Commonwealth during 1404–1514 and since 1611, was besieged by a Russian army in June 1654. The Polish garrison of the city (commanded by Smolensk Voivode Filip Obuchowicz) hoped to get reinforcements from the army of Janusz Radziwiłł (1612–1655), stationed in Orsha. Its situation worsened when Radziwiłł suffered a defeat from Prince Yakov Cherkassky in the Battle of Shklow. In September, the Polish garrison agreed to leave the city after it was promised a free retreat. The garrison left Smolensk and handed over its weapons and ensigns to the Russians before retreating to the Commonwealth-controlled territory. A significant number of landowners, however, preferred to stay and keep their estates, becoming subjects of the Russian Tsardom.

References 

Conflicts in 1654
1654 in Europe
Smolensk 1654
Smolensk 1654
Sieges involving the Grand Duchy of Lithuania
Smolensk 1654
Smolensk